The 1. Niederösterreichische Landesliga, is the football division of the state of Lower Austria. It’s the fourth highest league in Austrian Football for clubs of the Lower Austrian Football Association.

Prior to the introduction of a league for all of Austria in 1949, the Niederösterreichische Landesliga was the highest division for Lower Austrian football clubs. The winners during this period called themselves Meister von Niederösterreich (Lower Austrian Champions).

Mode
In the 1. Niederösterreichische Landesliga, a total of 16 football clubs from Lower Austria participate.

The champion rises directly into the third-highest division, the Regional League East. In addition to the champion of the 1. Niederösterreichische Landesliga, the champions of the Burgenland national league and Wiener Stadtliga, also move up. Under the 1. Niederösterreichische Landesliga are the 2. Landesliga Ost and 2. Landesliga West.

2020–21 member clubs 

SCU Ardagger
SCU-GLD Kilb
ASK Kottingbrunn
Kremser SC
SV Langenrohr
ASK Mannersdorf
SC Ortmann
SC Retz
USC Rohrbach
USV Scheiblingkirchen-Warth
ASV Schrems
ASV Spratzern
St. Pölten Juniors
SV Waidhofen/Thaya
SC Zwettl

References

Football competitions in Austria
Sport in Lower Austria